John Allen Chau (December 18, 1991 – November 17, 2018) was an American evangelical Christian missionary who was killed by the Sentinelese, indigenous people in voluntary isolation, after illegally traveling to North Sentinel Island, India in an attempt to convert the tribe to Christianity.

Early life 
John Allen Chau was born on December 18, 1991, in Scottsboro, Alabama, the third and youngest child of Lynda Adams-Chau, an organizer for Chi Alpha, and Patrick Chau, a Chinese-American psychiatrist who left China during the Cultural Revolution. Throughout his childhood, Chau loved camping, hiking and travelling, and excelled at various club, charity, and other extracurricular activities. He admired numerous explorers and missionaries including David Livingstone and Bruce Olson. 

He attended Oral Roberts University in Oklahoma, where he managed the university soccer team, and graduated cum laude in 2014 with a B.S. in Exercise Science. 

Prior to 2018, Chau participated in missionary trips to Mexico, South Africa and Iraqi Kurdistan. He first traveled to the Andaman Islands in 2015 and 2016 as part of his missionary trips, but did not visit North Sentinel Island at that time.

Contact with Sentinelese and death
In 2017, Chau participated in 'boot camp' missionary training by the Kansas City-based evangelical organization All Nations. According to a report by The New York Times, the training included navigating a mock native village populated by missionary staff members who pretended to be hostile natives, wielding fake spears. During that year, he reportedly expressed his interest in converting the Sentinelese. 

In October 2018, Chau traveled to and established his residence at Port Blair, capital of the Andaman and Nicobar Islands, where he prepared an initial contact kit including picture cards for communication, gifts for Sentinelese people, medical equipment, and other necessities. In August 2018, the Indian Home Ministry had removed 29 inhabited islands in Andaman and Nicobar from the Restricted Area Permit (RAP) regime, in an attempt to promote tourism. However, visiting North Sentinel Island without government permission remained illegal under the Andaman and Nicobar Islands (Protection of Aboriginal Tribes) Regulation, 1956.

In November, Chau embarked on an expedition to North Sentinel Island, which he considered to be "Satan's last stronghold on Earth", with the aim of contacting and living among the Sentinelese. In preparation for the trip, he was vaccinated and quarantined, and also undertook medical and linguistic training.

Chau paid two fishermen  (US$335.47) to take him close to the island. The fishermen were later arrested.

Chau expressed a clear desire to convert the tribe and was aware of the legal and mortal risks he was taking by his efforts, writing in his diary, "Lord, is this island Satan's last stronghold where none have heard or even had the chance to hear your name?", "The eternal lives of this tribe is at hand", and "I think it's worthwhile to declare Jesus to these people. Please do not be angry at them or at God if I get killed ... Don't retrieve my body."

The fishermen warned Chau not to go farther, but he canoed toward shore with a waterproof Bible. As he approached, he attempted to communicate with the islanders and to offer gifts, but he retreated after facing hostile responses.

On another visit, Chau recorded that the islanders reacted to him with a mixture of amusement, bewilderment and hostility. He attempted to sing worship songs to them, and spoke to them in Xhosa (a language spoken in Southern Africa), after which they often fell silent. Other attempts to communicate ended with them bursting into laughter. Chau stated they communicated with "lots of high pitched sounds" and gestures. Eventually, according to Chau’s last letter, when he tried to hand over fish and gifts, a boy shot a metal-headed arrow that pierced the Bible he was holding in front of his chest, after which he retreated again.

On his final visit, on November 17, Chau instructed the fishermen to leave without him. The fishermen later saw the islanders dragging Chau's body, and the next day they saw his body on the shore.

Aftermath
Upon learning about Chau's death, the fishermen returned to Port Blair and gave Chau's diary to his friend, also a Christian preacher, residing in the capital city. He informed Chau's family in the U.S., who contacted the Consulate General of the United States in Chennai for assistance. The Andaman government was notified on November 19. On November 21, the Director General of Police issued a statement on the restrictions on public access to the North Sentinel Island.

Despite efforts by Indian authorities, which involved a tense encounter with the tribe, Chau's body was not recovered. Indian officials made several attempts to recover the body but eventually abandoned those efforts. An anthropologist involved in the case told The Guardian that the risk of a dangerous clash between investigators and the islanders was too great to justify any further attempts. A murder case was opened following his death.

Chau was criticized by Survival International among others for visiting the island despite the possibility of introducing pathogens to the native Sentinelese, to whom it could have been deadly since it was likely that the natives had not been previously exposed to diseases from outside the island. All Nations, the evangelical organization that trained Chau, was criticized on social media for describing Chau as a martyr while expressing condolences for Chau's death. Chau's father also blamed his son's death on the missionary community for inculcating an extreme Christian vision within Chau.

In response to Chau's death, M. Sasikumar of the Maulana Abul Kalam Azad Institute of Asian Studies questioned the legal charge of murder and what he perceived as a romanticized version of the incident in the media. He wrote that the incident should instead serve as a warning that the "eyes-only" policy with regard to the Sentinelese needs to be more strictly enforced, and include the local fishermen in order to prevent a repetition.

Michael Schönhuth, Professor for Cultural Anthropology at the University of Trier, Germany, found the media response to Chau's killing of cultural interest: He wrote that the narratives that emerged were part of a larger discussion regarding the proper relationship between the modern world and the remaining isolated indigenous peoples.

Schönhuth wrote that contacting isolated people groups such as the Sentinelese still remains a controversial subject matter, even among experts. However, uncontrolled contact, as in the case of Chau, is forbidden because of the significant risk of lethal infections against the unprotected immune system of isolated communities.

References 

1991 births
2018 deaths
American people murdered abroad
American people of Chinese descent
American Protestant missionaries
Christian martyrs
Christians from Alabama
Christians from Washington (state)
Oral Roberts University alumni
People from Vancouver, Washington
People murdered in India
People from Scottsboro, Alabama